Pemra Özgen (born 8 May 1986) is a Turkish tennis player.

Özgen has won 18 singles and 23 doubles titles on the ITF Circuit. On 26 August 2019, she reached her best singles ranking of world No. 182. On 14 October 2013, she peaked at No. 179 in the WTA doubles rankings.

Playing for Turkey Fed Cup team, Özgen has a win–loss record of 40–44.

Özgen is an alumna of Istanbul Bilgi University.

Career
Özgen, born in Istanbul, began playing tennis at the age of eight, and later trained at local clubs Taçspor Kulübü and Dağcılık Tenis Spor Kulübü.

Özgen made her WTA Tour debut at the 2007 Istanbul Cup, partnering Çağla Büyükakçay in doubles. The Turkish pair lost their first round match against Mervana Jugić-Salkić and Romina Oprandi. But along with Büyükakçay, she has won eight ITF doubles titles.

Grand Slam singles performance timelines

ITF Circuit finals

Singles: 29 (18 titles, 11 runner–ups)

Doubles: 51 (23 titles, 28 runner–ups)

Notes

References

External links

 
 
 

1986 births
Living people
Sportspeople from Istanbul
Turkish female tennis players
Istanbul Bilgi University alumni
Mediterranean Games gold medalists for Turkey
Mediterranean Games silver medalists for Turkey
Competitors at the 2009 Mediterranean Games
Competitors at the 2013 Mediterranean Games
Mediterranean Games medalists in tennis
21st-century Turkish sportswomen